Aprilovo is a village in Gorna Malina municipality, Sofia Province, Bulgaria.

References

Villages in Sofia Province